Us Rah Par (Urdu: اس راہ پر) is Pakistani pop singer Junaid Jamshed Khan's second solo effort, after Junaid and the rest of the band members took a break from the Vital Signs. It was critically and commercially successful. Like many other Vital Signs albums, Us Rah Par continued Junaid's collaboration with Shoaib Mansoor. The title track Us Rah Par is a slow blues number which featured a video directed by Bilal Maqsood (of the band Strings). However it was the techno flavored Na Tu Ayegi which actually gave the album the much needed commercial push. Three songs in the album are composed by Biddu

Track listing

Notes

See also 
 Music of Pakistan
 Junaid Jamshed
 Vital Signs

Junaid Jamshed albums
1999 albums